Isa Campo (born 1975) is a Spanish screenwriter who has also directed and produced. She is a longtime collaborator of Isaki Lacuesta.

Biography 
Campo was born in Oviedo in 1975. She moved to Girona, Catalonia at a young age, in the wake of her family's work obligations. At age 14, she met Iñaki Lacuesta (aka Isaki Lacuesta), her longtime artistic collaborator and domestic partner. She is an industrial engineer and philosopher by training. She has worked as a lecturer on film direction for the Pompeu Fabra University.

Filmography

Accolades

References 

People from Girona

Living people
1975 births
21st-century Spanish screenwriters
Spanish film directors
Spanish television directors